Impostor is a 2010 Philippine television drama series loosely based on the PHR pocketbook of the same name created by Martha Cecilia and directed by Jerome Chavez Pobocan. It also serves as the 11th installment of the Precious Hearts Romances Presents series. The series stars Sam Milby, Maja Salvador, Melai Cantiveros, Jason Francisco, and Precious Lara Quigaman, with an ensemble cast consisting of Jon Avila, Izzy Canillo, Long Mejia, Yayo Aguila, Bobby Andrews, Menggie Cobarrubias, Racquel Villavicencio, Kitkat, Kakai Bautista, and Lollie Mara in their supporting roles. The series premiered on ABS-CBN's Hapontastic afternoon block from May 17 to September 17, 2010, replacing Precious Hearts Romances Presents: Love Me Again and was replaced by Precious Hearts Romances Presents: Alyna.

This is about people who got into an accident and end up changing faces.

Synopsis 
The story revolves around a young province woman named Devin. Devin believes that she was given an unusual face that no man would ever want. She envies women such as Mariz who is unhappily married to Anthony, who is her crush. Little does Devin know that Popoy, her childhood friend, has feelings for her.
One day, both Devin and Mariz are involved in the same car accident. Mariz dies while Devin is able to live. Devin was given a choice to be able to live by a plastic surgeon named Monique Benitez, but in the face of Mariz. Devin agreed and was implanted with Mariz's face.

Devin is now confused on how to live her new life after leaving Popoy and her poor life behind and starting a new life with a new beautiful face with the man of her dreams.

Cast and characters

Main cast
Sam Milby as Anthony Florencio 
Maja Salvador as Mariz Benitez-Florencio and Devina "Devin" Ventura
Melai Cantiveros as Devina "Devin" Ventura and Mariz Florencio 
Jason Francisco as Popoy Calantiao
Precious Lara Quigaman as Monique Benitez

Supporting cast
Jon Avila as Julio Cabrera
Izzy Canillo as Joshua Florencio
Long Mejia as Nestor Ventura
Yayo Aguila as Lira Aguilar-Ventura
Bobby Andrews as Leo Serrano
Menggie Cobarrubias as Don Manuel Aguilar
Racquel Villavicencio as Donya Valeria Florencio
Kitkat as Anita
Cacai Bautista as Bettina
Lollie Mara as Donya Cecilia Aguilar

Guest cast
Gerard Pizzaras as Mariz and Monique's Father
Gee-Ann Abrahan as Mariz and Monique's Mother
Jairus Aquino as Young Anthony
Phebe Kay Arbontante as Young Mariz
Cherry Lou as Young Valeria Florencio
Arnold Reyes as Young Alejandro Florencio
Manuel Chua as Young Valeria Florencio's lover
Melai Cantiveros (2nd girl) as Liza (appeared at the last episode)

Awards and nominations
Impostor earned a gold medal for the Best Telenovela Category in the International Emmy Awards, along with Argentina's Contra las Cuerdas, Brazil's Destiny River and Portugal's Lacos de Sangue.

See also
List of ABS-CBN drama series
Precious Hearts Romances Presents

References

ABS-CBN drama series
2010 Philippine television series debuts
2010 Philippine television series endings
Television shows based on books
Filipino-language television shows
Television shows filmed in the Philippines